Loch Cluanie (Scottish Gaelic: Loch Cluanaidh) is a loch in the Northwest Highlands of Scotland at the south-east end of Glen Shiel. It is a reservoir, contained behind the Cluanie Dam, constructed by Mitchell Construction and completed in 1957 as part of the North of Scotland Hydro-Electric Board's Glenmoriston project to generate hydroelectricity. Water feeds the dam from the west via two flows, from a tunnel from the dammed Loch Loyne and via the River Moriston.

The A87 road runs along the north edge of the loch.

The hamlet of Cluanie is on the west side of the loch. It has a car park, the Cluanie Inn and two houses which are used as "holiday homes" by their owners.

The Cluanie Inn is the site of  a weather station. It is also at or near the start/end points of several walks into the neighbouring hills, which include several Munros.

Cluanie Lodge is a private dwelling owned by the estate and land owner, which is the primary residence of the owner, on the south-west corner of the loch. The dwelling has been extensively renovated over the last 5 years prior to it becoming the owners main residence. The richly vegetated areas at the side of the loch are home to small birds such as the willow warbler and the wren.

On 31 August 2021, the Scotland Charity Air Ambulance landed at Loch Cluanie to the west of Cluanie Dam, to assist with a male who had fallen on rocks and sustained head and back injuries.

See also 

List of reservoirs and dams in the United Kingdom

References

External links
A panorama of the area from 

Cluanie Inn

Reservoirs in Highland (council area)
Lochs of Highland (council area)
Freshwater lochs of Scotland
LCluanie